On January 15, 2010, the Department of Defense complied with a court order and published a list of Captives held in the Bagram Theater Internment Facility that included the name Pasta Khan.

There were 645 names on the list, which was dated September 22, 2009, and was heavily redacted.

Historian Andy Worthington, author of The Guantanamo Files, speculated Pasta Khan might be "Masta Khan", a foreign fighter and weapons facilitator.
He is reported to have been captured in Terzayi district, Khost province, on July 9, 2009.

References

Bagram Theater Internment Facility detainees
Living people
Year of birth missing (living people)